Loud Pack is the seventh studio album by the American rapper Project Pat. It was released on July 19, 2011, by Hypnotize Minds.

Track listing

Chart history

References 

2011 albums
Project Pat albums
Hardcore hip hop albums
Albums produced by DJ Paul
Albums produced by Juicy J